Kawane may refer to:

 Kawane, Shizuoka, town in Japan
 Kawane, Senegal, village in Senegal, in the Kataba Arrondissement
 9033 Kawane, minor planet